Pretzsch may refer to:

 Pretzsch, Burgenlandkreis, a community in the Burgenlandkreis in Saxony-Anhalt, Germany
 Pretzsch, Wittenberg, a community in the Wittenberg district in Saxony-Anhalt, Germany